Tennessee state elections in 2022 were held on Tuesday, November 8, 2022. Primary elections for the United States House of Representatives, governatoral, Tennessee Senate, and Tennessee House of Representatives, as well as retention elections for all five Tennessee Supreme Court justices, were held on August 4, 2022. There were also four constitutional amendments to the Constitution of Tennessee on the November 8 ballot.

United States Congress

House of Representatives 

District results

Republican

 

Democratic

Tennessee elected nine U.S. Representatives, each representing one of Tennessee's nine Congressional Districts.

Results

Gubernatorial

The Tennessee's gubernatorial election was held on November 8, 2022, to elect the Governor of Tennessee. Incumbent Republican Governor Bill Lee was re-elected to a second term with almost 65% of the vote, improving on his performance from 2018.

The Tennessee primaries took place on August 4, 2022, with Lee and Democrat Jason Martin winning their respective parties' nominations.

Lee was sworn in on January 21, 2023.

Results 

August 4, 2022, Primary Results

State Legislature

State Senate

Elections for 17 of the 33 seats in Tennessee's State Senate were held on November 8, 2022. There was 3 open seats and 14 incumbents that ran for re-election.

State House of Representatives

Results by state house district

Republican

Democratic

The election of all 99 seats in the Tennessee House of Representatives occurred on November 8, 2022.

Republicans gained two seats, expanding their supermajority in the state house even more. John Windle lost his re-election bid after registering as an Independent.

Close races
Four races were decided by a margin of 10% or less:

Ballot measures

Amendment 1
This is an approved legislatively referred constitutional amendment to the Constitution of Tennessee. The amendment adds language to the constitution to prohibit workplaces from requiring mandatory labor union membership for employees as a condition for employment. The U.S. state of Tennessee has been a right-to-work state by statute since 1947. However, this referendum will make the law a right and amendment written into the state's constitution.

Amendment 2
This amendment would add to article III, section 12 of the Tennessee Constitution a process for the temporary exercise of the powers and duties of the governor by the Speaker of the Senate—or the Speaker of the House if there is no Speaker of the Senate in office—when the governor is unable to discharge the powers and duties of the office of governor. While a Speaker is temporarily discharging the powers and duties of the governor, the Speaker would not be required to resign as Speaker or to resign as a member of the legislature; but the Speaker would not be able to preside as Speaker or vote as a member of the legislature. A Speaker who is temporarily discharging the powers and duties of the governor would not get the governor’s salary but would get the Speaker’s salary. The amendment would also exempt a Speaker who is temporarily discharging the powers and duties of the governor from provisions in the Constitution that would otherwise prohibit the Speaker from exercising the powers of the governor and from simultaneously holding more than one state office.

Amendment 3
This amendment would change the current language in article I, section 33 of the Tennessee Constitution, which says that slavery and involuntary servitude, except as punishment for a person who has been duly convicted of crime, are forever prohibited in this State. The amendment would delete this current language and replace it with the following language: “Slavery and involuntary servitude are forever prohibited. Nothing in this section shall prohibit an inmate from working when the inmate has been duly convicted of a crime.”

Amendment 4
This amendment would delete article IX, section 1 of the Tennessee Constitution, which prohibits ministers of the gospel and priests of any denomination from holding a seat in either House of the legislature.

Supreme Court

Retention elections (August 4, 2022) 
All incumbent Tennessee Supreme Court Justices won their retention elections.

See also
 Elections in Tennessee
 Political party strength in Tennessee
 Tennessee Democratic Party
 Tennessee Republican Party
 Government of Tennessee
 Tennessee Supreme Court
 2022 United States elections

Notes

References 

2022 Tennessee elections
Tennessee